Hoseynabad-e Surmaq (also Romanized as Ḩoseynābād-e Sūrmaq; also known as Hosein Abad Soormagh and Ḩoseynābād-e Sūrmag) is a village in Rostaq Rural District, in the Central District of Neyriz County, Fars Province, Iran. At the 2006 census, its population was 82, in 16 families.

References 

Populated places in Neyriz County